Eston College is a private Christian post-secondary educational institution located in Eston, Saskatchewan, Canada. Since 1944 it has served as the primary training center for the Apostolic Church of Pentecost (ACOP) and welcomes students from across Canada and around the world.  In a rural setting, Eston College provides an educational and discipleship setting that "allows you to learn more about yourself, your world, and your creator."

History

Founding
In 1944 at a Trossachs Camp meeting a meeting was called to discuss the location and operation of a Bible school that would serve the churches in the ACOP, which at the time was called the "Full Gospel Missions Fellowship". At this meeting five men were appointed to carry out the work of starting a Bible college for the fellowship. The five men on this committee were Glen McLean, Lorne Pritchard, Ron Burnside, Elmer Powers, and Harold Hollands.

These five men built the foundation for the Full Gospel Bible Institute (FGBI) that opened its doors on November 6, 1944, welcoming six students. Eston was chosen as the location for the Bible School after a number of locations were considered. Some of these were Pangman and Trossachs, SK, and Eston SK. "G. S. McLean's presence at Eston and the local churches willingness to donate a site at Eston may have been factors that tipped the scales."

History
Situated in the far south-east corner of the small farming community, Eston College began with an old farm house and use of the Eston Full Gospel Church on the other side of town. The student body grew quickly and by the second term of 1944–1945 school year there were 18 students registered. During the early years G. S. McLean was the Principal with Rev. W. B. Marshall and his wife serving as teachers, the registrar, and the secretary. The early years depended upon adjunct faculty such as Lorne Pritchard, Ern Baxter, and Albert Marshall. The Bible education received in these early years set a precedent for the future of FGBI.

In a meeting in Eston on October 8, 1953, the governing bodies of FGBI and the Apostolic Missionary Training Institute (AMTI) met for the final time to complete the merger of the two Bible schools. The two church fellowships of the ACOP and the Evangelical Churches of Pentecost were already undergoing talks of a merger and it was deemed unnecessary to have two Bible schools. It was decided that AMTI would close down and the students would be transferred to FGBI.

G. S. McLean served at the president of FGBI for 39 years and saw the small prairie Bible school grow from 6 students in its inaugural year to a peak that stands to this day of 187 students in 1976. During this time FGBI also saw its campus develop and other departments open within the institution. Notably FGBI Press, Summer Institute of Missions, the A. D. Marshall Library, The Bible and Science Department, and was host to numerous conferences and gatherings.

In April 1983 the Board of Directors of FGBI appointed Rev. Alan Mortensen as president and Willard Mitchell as vice president. Although G. S. McLean retired as president he became Chancellor of the Full Gospel Bible Institute until his death in 2000. Alan Mortensen would lead FGBI through the next 12 years seeing growth and change take place as time progressed through the eighties and nineties. During Alan Mortensen's tenure as president there was a devastating fire that destroyed the chapel which led to further campus development, there were new ministry opportunities that were made available, a flag was adopted for the institution, and growth was to take place after an enrolment low in 1986 with 97 students.

In 1997 the College Board of Directors appointed Todd Atkinson, as president. During Atkinson's time at FGBI there was significant campus development and a newly recognized desire to see the School move toward accreditation so it could offer degrees and transferable credit.

In 1999 Lauren Miller was appointed president. During the 10 years that Lauren Miller was president FGBI changed its name to The Full Gospel Bible College in October 2005, and then again to Eston College in May 2007. The college started to grant Bachelor of Biblical Studies Degrees in 2000 offering diploma upgrades to previous graduates (see academics) and currently enrolled students a 4-year bachelors program. Miller guided the college through the eight-year accreditation process with the Association for Biblical Higher Education with the college receiving full 5 year initial accreditation in May 2007.

In 2008, Brian Fuller was appointed president. Since then, the college has eliminated its debt and improved its facilities. Fuller guided the college through ABHE accreditation and in 2012 the college was given an ABHE recommendation for 10 years. New programs have been added under Fuller's presidency. GO Discipleship, introduced in 2009, credits students for Biblical Studies and ministry trips to the poor and disadvantaged. A program called Martyr's Life began in 2012, focusing on students learning first hand the gifts and offices of the Holy Spirit, such as evangelism, healing, the prophetic, etc. The Gideon's Call program, also created in 2012, focuses on the role of music ministry both inside and outside the church body. Finally, an IT program was added in 2013 where students enrolled in Biblical Studies can also learn how to manage media to further promote the gospel.

In 2019, Brenda Frost was named the Interim President. The college was restructured, introducing "Learning Tracks" for all freshman students. Currently students can choose from three Tracks: Music, Evangelism and Prayer.

Presidents of Eston College
There have been five presidents of Eston College 
Dr. G. S. McLean (1944–83)
Rev. Alan Mortensen (1983–97)
Rev. Todd Atkinson (1997–99)
Rev. Lauren Miller (1999–2008)
Rev. Brian Fuller (2008–2019)
Brenda Frost (2019-2020)
Rev. Sean Stevenson-Douglas (2020–present)

Academics
Eston College offers a variety of programs all with a focus on biblical studies and theology. At the conclusion of the eight-year accreditation process the Association for Biblical Higher Education gave Eston College accredited status.

Programs offered
Eston College offers a Certificate, Associate Diploma, Diploma in, and Bachelor of, Biblical Studies, as well as Bachelor of Arts degrees in Christian Studies and Interdisciplinary Studies. The college also teaches English as a Second Language and offers a program that provides students with accredited classes in tandem with outreach and Christian ministry opportunities.

Student life
Students at Eston College are generally required to live in College Residences for a portion of their education. This gives students an opportunity to live, grow, and build relationships in an environment that fosters personal and spiritual growth.
Chapel and Community activities are scheduled on a weekly basis promoting personal and spiritual growth. These events provide the college community an opportunity to participate in traditional chapel services and hear speakers from a diverse variety of backgrounds.
Student Representative Council (SRC) is the student government that provides leadership to students at Eston College. The SRC is involved in curriculum planning, student services, the library development, among other aspects of school leadership.
Eston College has a history of providing students with an opportunity to participate in physical activity at personal, intramural, and competitive levels. There are work out facilities located in the dorms, Student Services provides intramural floor hockey and other sports/games opportunities for students, and full-time students are able participate in competitive sports in the Prairie Athletic Conference.
Part of Eston Colleges mandate is to provide opportunities for ministry and practical life experience. Two of the opportunities Eston College provides for students are Contact Teams and World Action Teams.

See also 

 Pentecostalism

Notes

References

External links 
 Eston College Home Page
 Eston College ABHE Profile
 Apostolic Church of Pentecost Home Page

Colleges in Saskatchewan
Evangelical seminaries and theological colleges in Canada
Bible colleges
Educational institutions established in 1944
1944 establishments in Saskatchewan